Juventus F.C. is the name of several association football clubs in Europe and Latin America:

 Juventus F.C., an Italian association football club based in Turin. It can also refer to:
 Juventus F.C. (women), women's association football club
 Juventus Next Gen, men's reserve team of Juventus F.C.
 Juventus F.C. Youth Sector, men's youth system of Juventus F.C.
 Juventus F.C. (Belize), a Belizean football club from Orange Walk Town
 Juventus F.C. (Nicaragua), a Nicaraguan football club from Managua
 Juventus Foot-Ball Club, an Italian defunct football club from Florence
 Juventus Futebol Clube, a Brazilian football club from Rio de Janeiro